Angraecum doratophyllum is a species of comet orchid that is endemic to São Tomé and Príncipe. On São Tomé, it can be found from elevations of 850–1,600 m, growing with Syzygium guineense or with Bulbophyllum lizae. On Príncipe, it is found in shrubby vegetation at around 300 m elevation. It is threatened by deforestation for agriculture and timber.

References

distichum
Endangered plants
Endemic flora of São Tomé and Príncipe
Flora of São Tomé Island
Flora of Príncipe